Sorin Dorel Colceag (born 11 March 1972 in Buzău) is a Romanian football manager and former goalkeeper.

During his career Colceag played with Unirea Focșani, Dinamo București, Universitatea Cluj, Național București, Rocar București, Croatian NK Zagreb, Politehnica Iași, Belgian Lokeren, Mexican Tigres Ciudad de Juarez, Argeș Pitești, Czech Viktoria Plzeň, Greek clubs Panionios and Panserraikos and finished his career back in Romania with FC Brașov in 2006.

Colceag made 14 appearances for Romania U21 in 1992 and 1993.

Honours
Dinamo București
Divizia A: 1989–90
Universitatea Cluj
Divizia B: 1991–92
Viktoria Plzeň
Czech 2. Liga: 2002–03

References

External sources
 

1972 births
Living people
People from Buzău
Romanian footballers
Association football goalkeepers
Romania under-21 international footballers
CSM Focșani players
FC Dinamo București players
FC Universitatea Cluj players
FC Progresul București players
AFC Rocar București players
FC Politehnica Iași (1945) players
FC Argeș Pitești players
FC Brașov (1936) players
Liga I players
Liga II players
NK Zagreb players
Croatian Football League players
K.S.C. Lokeren Oost-Vlaanderen players
Belgian Pro League players
FC Viktoria Plzeň players
Czech First League players
Panionios F.C. players
Panserraikos F.C. players
Super League Greece players
Romanian expatriate footballers
Expatriate footballers in Croatia
Romanian expatriate sportspeople in Croatia
Expatriate footballers in Mexico
Romanian expatriate sportspeople in Mexico
Expatriate footballers in Belgium
Romanian expatriate sportspeople in Belgium
Expatriate footballers in the Czech Republic
Romanian expatriate sportspeople in the Czech Republic
Expatriate footballers in Greece
Romanian expatriate sportspeople in Greece
Romanian football managers
FC Metaloglobus București managers
FC Zimbru Chișinău managers
Moldovan Super Liga managers
Romanian expatriate football managers
Expatriate football managers in Moldova
Romanian expatriate sportspeople in Moldova